Senator Casperson may refer to:

Carl B. Casperson (1877–1953), Wisconsin State Senate
Tom Casperson (1959-2020), Michigan State Senate